Gyrophoric acid is a depside that can be found in the lichen Cryptothecia rubrocincta and in Xanthoparmelia pokomyi. It can also be found in most of the species of the Actinogyra, Lasallia, and Umbilicaria genera.

See also 
 Umbilicaric acid

References 

Polyphenols
Salicylic acids
Salicylate esters
Resorcinols